The Twenty Ninth Hawaii State Legislature is the current meeting of the legislative branch of the State of Hawaii, composed of the Hawaii House of Representatives and the Hawaii Senate. It met in Honolulu from November 10, 2016, to November 6, 2018, during the final two years of David Ige's first term as governor. The 2016 elections gave Democrats an even larger majority in both legislative bodies, with the losses of one Republican representative and lone Republican senator Sam Slom.

On March 22, 2017, former House Minority Leader Beth Fukumoto announced she would leave the Republican Party and seek membership in the Democratic Party. This lowered Republican membership in the Hawaii House of Representatives to 5 against 45 Democrats.

Major Events 
 January 18, 2017: Opening Day of the 2017 Legislative Session
 February 2, 2017: House Minority Leader Beth Fukumoto was ousted over her criticisms of President Donald Trump. She was replaced by Minority Floor Leader Andria Tupola of Nanakuli.
 March 22, 2017: Republican Representative and former House Minority Leader Beth Fukumoto announced her resignation from the Republican Party and her intention to seek membership with the Democratic Party.
 May 3, 2017: A bill to fund Honolulu's rail transit system failed when the Senate and House of Representatives could not reach an agreement after 11 hours. Governor David Ige announced he would not extend the legislative session unless the two houses came to a consensus despite the requests of all four Hawaii mayors.
 May 4, 2017: Senator Jill Tokuda was removed from the Senate Ways and Means Committee for her role in killing the rail funding bill. House Speaker Joseph M. Souki resigned from his post and was replaced by House Majority Leader Scott Saiki. This was also the final day of the 2017 Legislative Session.

Major Legislation

Enacted

Proposed 
 May 2, 2017: SB562: Requires the Attorney General to defend any civil action against the county based on negligence, wrongful act, or omission of a county lifeguard for services at a designated state beach park.
 May 3, 2017: HB100: State Budget for fiscal years 2018-2019
 May 3, 2017: HB115: Requires all counties with populations over 500,000 to take ownership and jurisdiction over all "disputed roads" under certain circumstances
 May 3, 2017: HB335: Office of Hawaiian Affairs budget for fiscal years 2018–2019.
 May 3, 2017: HB451: Reduces the minimum Hawaiian blood quantum requirement of certain successors to lessees of Hawaiian home lands from one-quarter to one thirty-second.
 May 3, 2017: 	HB1098: Requires emergency shelters to have partitioned space for homeless persons or families.

Vetoed

Party Summary

Senate

House of Representatives

Leadership

Senate 
 President: Ron Kouchi (D)
 Vice President: Michelle Kidani (D)

Majority (Democratic) Leadership 
 Majority Leader: J. Kalani English
 Majority Caucus Leader: Brickwood Galuteria
 Majority Floor Leader: Will Espero
 Majority Whip: Donovan Dela Cruz
 Assistant Majority Whip: Brian Taniguchi

House of Representatives 
 Speaker: Joseph M. Souki (D), until May 4, 2017
 Scott Saiki (D), from May 4, 2017
Speaker Emeritus: Calvin Say (D)
Speaker Emeritus: Joseph M. Souki (D), from May 4, 2017
Vice Speaker: John Mizuno (D)

Majority (Democratic) Leadership 
Majority Leader: Scott Saiki, until May 4, 2017
Majority Floor Leader: Cindy Evans
Majority Policy Leader: Marcus Oshiro
Majority Whip: Kent Ito
Assistant Majority Leaders: Chris Lee, Dee Morikawa, and Roy Takumi

Minority (Republican) Leadership 
Minority Leader: Beth Fukumoto, until February 2, 2017
Andria Tupola, from February 2, 2017
Minority Leader Emeritus: Gene Ward
Assistant Minority Leader: Bob McDermott
Minority Floor Leader: Andria Tupola, until February 2, 2017
Gene Ward, from February 2, 2017
Assistant Minority Floor Leader: Cynthia Thielen
Minority Whip: Lauren Matsumoto

Members

Senate

Hawaii 
 Kaiali‘i Kahele (D-1)
 Russell Ruderman (D-2)
 Josh Green (D-3)
 Lorraine Inouye (D-4)
 Rosalyn Baker (D-6)

Maui, Molokai, and Lanai 
 Gilbert Keith-Agaran (D-5)
 J. Kalani English (D-7)

Kauai and Niihau 
 Ron Kouchi (D-8)

Oahu 
 Stanley Chang (D-9)
 Les Ihara, Jr. (D-10)
 Brian Taniguchi (D-11)
 Brickwood Galuteria (D-12)
 Karl Rhoads (D-13)
 Donna Mercado Kim (D-14)
 Glenn Wakai (D-15)
 Breene Harimoto (D-16)
 Clarence K. Nishihara (D-17)
 Michelle Kidani (D-18)
 Will Espero (D-19)
 Mike Gabbard (D-20)
 Maile Shimabukuro (D-4)
 Donovan Dela Cruz (D-22)
 Gil Riviere (D-23)
 Jill Tokuda (D-24)
 Laura Thielen (D-25)

References 

Government of Hawaii